Detroit Conservatory of Music was a music school in Detroit, Michigan. It was considered one of the leading institutions of music in the United States. It was founded in 1874 by J. H. Hahn and opened a normal school training department in 1889.

It was located at 5035 Woodward Avenue. In 1909 the Detroit Conservatory Orchestra was organized at the school.

Chapters of Mu Phi Epsilon and Sigma Alpha Iota existed at the school.

The school featured on postcards. The Detroit Historical Society has a collection of documents from the school. The Detroit Public Library has a photograph of a woman playing violin at the school.

Alumni
Notable alumni include:
Antoinette Garnes
Lou Hooper
T. J. Fowler
Rachel Andresen
Dennis Edwards
Jean DuShon
Johnny Desmond
Les Baxter
Betty Carter
Agnes Woodward
Lucia Dlugoszewski
Boyd Marshall
Thomas Whitfield (singer)
Gaylord Yost (1904–1905)
Patricia Terry-Ross
James Frazier (1940–1984)
Kenneth Louis Cox II
Elizebeth Thomas Werlein

References

Music schools in Michigan